Ntcham may be,

Ntcham language (Bassari)
Ntcham Braille
Olivier Ntcham